No, No, Nanette is a 1930 American pre-Code musical comedy film with Technicolor sequences that was directed by Clarence G. Badger and released by First National Pictures. It was adapted from the play of the same title by Otto A. Harbach and Frank Mandel. No, No, Nanette was a popular show on Broadway, running for 321 performances, and was produced and directed by Harry Frazee.

Plot
Jim Smith, a millionaire due to his Bible publishing business, is married to the overly frugal Sue. They desire to teach their ward Nanette to be a respectable young lady; she, in turn, has an untapped wild side. Nanette wants to have some fun in Atlantic City, while she is being pursued by Tom Trainor.

With so much unspent income at his disposal, Jim decides to become the benefactor for three beautiful women, but soon realizes his good intentions are bound to get him in trouble. He enlists his lawyer friend Bill to help him discreetly ease the girls out of his life. Sue and Billy's wife, Lucille, learn about the women and assume their husbands are having affairs with them.

Eventually, Bill and Jim explain the situation and are forgiven by their wives. Likewise, Nanette and Tom sort out their difficulties and decide to get married.

Cast
Bernice Claire as Nanette 
Alexander Gray as Tom Trainor 
Lucien Littlefield as Jim Smith 
Louise Fazenda as Sue Smith 
Lilyan Tashman as Lucille 
Bert Roach as Bill Early 
ZaSu Pitts as Pauline 
Mildred Harris as Betty 
Henry Stockbridge as Brady
Jocelyn Lee as Flora

Songs
"No, No, Nanette" – words by Otto Harbach, music by Vincent Youmans 
"Tea for Two" – words by Irving Caesar, music by Vincent Youmans
"I Want to Be Happy" – words by Irving Caesar, music by Vincent Youmans
"King of the Air" – words and music by Al Bryan and Ed Ward
"Dancing to Heaven" – words and music by Al Bryan and Ed Ward
"As Long As I'm With You" – words and music by Grant Clarke and Harry Akst
"Dance of the Wooden Shoes" – words and music by Ned Washington, Herb Magidson and Michael Cleary

Preservation
According to the George Eastman Museum 2015 Book "The Dawn of Technicolor, 1915-1935" the BFI National Archive  holds a 35mm incomplete nitrate print 160 ft.

Box office
According to Warner Bros records the film earned $839,000 domestically and $612,000 foreign.

Critical reception
Mordaunt Hall of The New York Times wrote, "No, No, Nannette, proves to be quite a merry affair with tunes that are now well known and players whose activities were rewarded with gusts of laughter from the first-night audience at Warners' Strand. It is a show that stirs up mirth from persons who might desire a more sophisticated type of entertainment, for its comedy of wives discovering the more or less harmless deceit of their husbands is invariably unfailing. The technicolor sequences are not always as well lighted as one would wish, but the staging of these tinted episodes is wrought with no little imagination, especially the glimpses of an airship with turquoise lights and a variety of colors on the fuselage. It is from this stage contrivance that Bernice Claire as Nanette sings one of her songs. Her partner, Tom Trainor, played by Alexander Gray, is also moved to song. The most effective stretches of this diversion, however, are those in black and white."

See also
List of early color feature films
List of incomplete or partially lost films

References

External links

1930 musical comedy films
1930s color films
1930 lost films
American musical comedy films
1930s English-language films
Films based on musicals
Films directed by Clarence G. Badger
Films set in Atlantic City, New Jersey
Lost American films
First National Pictures films
Warner Bros. films
Lost comedy films
1930s American films